Great Day (also released as The Great Day) is an album by saxophonist James Moody recorded in 1963 and released on the Argo label. It was supervised by Esmond Edwards who also did the cover painting.

Reception

Ron Wynn of Allmusic states: "Some good, sometimes excellent sax and flute work from the always reliable James Moody. This was a period in which he was dabbling sometimes in soul jazz and other times in hard bop, but mostly played mainstream, straight-ahead originals, standards, and ballads".

Track listing 
All compositions by Tom McIntosh, except as indicated
 "Great Day" - 4:00   
 "The Search" - 4:35   
 "Let's Try" - 3:22   
 "One Never Knows" (John Lewis) - 5:18   
 "Opales'que" (Dennis Sandole) - 5:01   
 "Blues Impromptu" (James Moody) - 5:30   
 "Malice Toward None" - 5:20

Personnel 
James Moody - alto saxophone, tenor saxophone, flute
Johnny Coles, Thad Jones- trumpet
Hubert Laws - flute
Hank Jones, Bernie Leighton - piano
Jim Hall - guitar
Richard Davis - bass 
Mel Lewis - drums
Tom McIntosh - arranger, conductor

References 

James Moody (saxophonist) albums
1963 albums
Argo Records albums
Albums arranged by Tom McIntosh
Albums produced by Esmond Edwards